Adly Kasseb عدلى كاسب  (full name: Adly Abdel Hamid Kasseb)  (April 21, 1918 – September 13, 1978) was an Egyptian actor who acted in many movies and plays. His talent was recognized since he was a child and has grown over the years. He graduated from the faculty of Applied Arts then worked as a teacher in the faculty of Engineering for 12 years. When the Institute of Dramatic Art opened he joined it and earned a Bachelor of Dramatic Art. He resigned his job in the faculty of Engineering and worked as an acting teacher in the Ministry of Education, he was promoted until he reached Undersecretary of the Ministry. He joined a lot of theater teams, starting with "The Modern Theater (national)" then "Youssef Wahby" then "Ismail Yasin " then "El Rayhany" then "Hassan Yousef" then "El Rayhany" again which he acted in for about 30 years. He was nicknamed "the actor of the 1000 faces" or "the cinema demon" for his ability to act any role personifying the different types of personalities, he acted many roles from comedy to evil.

He also acted in Rodda Qalbi, Gameela, Mal Wa Nissa, A’sefa Min El Hub, El Hub Keda, Thalath Losoos and Al-Zawjah al-Azra'

References 

https://www.facebook.com/AdlyKasseb
https://web.archive.org/web/20110715230814/http://cinema.sakhr.com/cast/pmovies.aspx?PID=1804
http://www.imdb.com/name/nm0440839/

Egypt online cinema websites
 
https://web.archive.org/web/20190330051945/http://egycinemas.com/ – The Ultimate Egyptian Cinema Guide For Movies and Theaters online

Egyptian male film actors
1918 births
1978 deaths
Egyptian male television actors
20th-century Egyptian male actors